Janus Airways was an airline, formed by Hurds Travel for inclusive tours, based in the United Kingdom, flying between 1982 and 1987, when it was acquired by Euroair. It operated mainly from UK regional airports such as Lydd Airport and Coventry Airport, flying Handley Page Dart Herald and Vickers Viscount aircraft.

See also
 List of defunct airlines of the United Kingdom

References

External links 

Defunct airlines of the United Kingdom